Bridge 634, Northern Central Railway is a historic stone arch railroad bridge in Shrewsbury Township, York County, Pennsylvania.  It was built in 1871, and measures about  overall. The brown limestone and brick bridge was built by the Northern Central Railway and crosses a roadway and Codorus Creek.

It was added to the National Register of Historic Places in 1995.

References

Railroad bridges on the National Register of Historic Places in Pennsylvania
Bridges completed in 1871
Bridges in York County, Pennsylvania
National Register of Historic Places in York County, Pennsylvania
Stone arch bridges in the United States